Robert Hugh (Bob) "Pee Wee" Pickering (September 19, 1932 – June 24, 2015) was a Canadian farmer, curler and former political figure in Saskatchewan. He represented Bengough-Milestone from 1978 to 1991 in the Legislative Assembly of Saskatchewan as a Progressive Conservative.

Life and career
Pickering was born in Wilcox, Saskatchewan in 1932, the son of Leslie Pickering. In 1960, Pickering married Dorothy Ann Somerville. They had three children.

Pickering died June 24, 2015 in Alberta.

Curling career
Pickering, known for having the "World's highest backswing" was also a Saskatchewan men's curling champion.  Pickering, as a skip won 4 consecutive provincial titles between 1968 and 1971, and also won in 1966 and as a lead in 1961. Pickering represented Saskatchewan at six Briers; finishing second (8-2) in 1961 playing for the John Keyes rink, tied for third (7-3) in 1966, second (8-2) in 1968, tied for third (7-3) in 1969, fourth (6-4) in 1970 and third (8-3) in 1971.

Pickering was named to the Canadian Curling Hall of Fame in 1974.

Political career
He served in the Saskatchewan cabinet as Minister of Rural Affairs, as Minister of Rural Development and as Minister of Parks and Renewable Resources. Pickering was dropped from cabinet in January 1985. In the previous year, Pickering had been charged with impaired driving and leaving the scene of an accident.

References 

1932 births
2015 deaths
Progressive Conservative Party of Saskatchewan MLAs
Curlers from Saskatchewan
Canadian sportsperson-politicians
Members of the Executive Council of Saskatchewan
Canadian male curlers